Aiken may refer to:

Places
 Aiken, Illinois
 Aiken County, South Carolina
 Aiken, South Carolina, Aiken County's county seat
 The University of South Carolina Aiken
 Aiken, Texas (disambiguation)
Aiken, Bell County, Texas
Aiken, Floyd County, Texas
Aiken, Shelby County, Texas
 Inman, Kansas, once known as Aiken
 Delta, Utah, originally a railroad switch known as Aiken

Other uses
Aiken (surname)
Aiken code, a complementary BCD code
 A file format for storing a database of multiple choice questions, used e.g. in the Moodle learning management system
 The Aiken format lets you create multiple-choice or true-false questions using a simple, human-readable format that you can save as a plain text file and import into a Moodle learning management system course.

Aiken (name)
Aiken - Male